Jeff Wood (born January 20, 1957) is an American former race car driver born in Wichita, Kansas. He was Formula Atlantic Rookie of the Year in 1977. He drove in the CanAm series for Carl Haas in 1981 and finished 5th in the series behind Danny Sullivan. In 1982, driving for Bob Garretson Racing, finished 3rd place in the 24 Hours of Daytona. He then made his CART debut in 1983 at the Caesars Palace Grand Prix driving for Dan Gurney. He then drove in the Formula Atlantic West Series where he won the 1985 championship. He returned to CART in 1987 and made 4 starts for Dick Simon with his best finish being 10th. He was away from the series in 1988, then returned in 1989 to make 5 starts for Gohr Racing, where he finished 12th at the Michigan 500. In 1990 he drove for a new team, Todd Walther Racing, where he made his first attempt to qualify for the Indianapolis 500, but crashed in practice. He made 10 other starts, with a 10th-place finish at Phoenix, finishing 22nd in points. In 1991 he made 8 starts for Dale Coyne Racing, Arciero Racing, and Euromotorsports with the best finish being 13th. 7 starts in '92 for Arciero netted Wood a 12th-place finish and a single point. In 1993 Wood attempted a nearly full season for Andrea Moda Formula/Euromotorsports but failed to qualify for 6 races and only made 8 starts and again failed to score points. He made four more unsuccessful starts in 1994 for Euromotorsports in what would be his final races in the series. He was named to an entry for the 1996 Indianapolis 500, but the car failed to appear. His best finish in his 49 CART races was an 8th place that came in his second series start back in 1983 at Laguna Seca Raceway.

Racing record

SCCA National Championship Runoffs

Complete USAC Mini-Indy Series results

PPG Indy Car Series

References

External links
 CART statistics at ChampCarStats.com
 1981 Can-Am Results at OldRacingCars.com

1957 births
24 Hours of Daytona drivers
Atlantic Championship drivers
Champ Car drivers
Living people
Sportspeople from Wichita, Kansas
Racing drivers from Kansas
SCCA National Championship Runoffs participants

Dale Coyne Racing drivers
EuroInternational drivers